This is a summary of notable incidents that have taken place at various independently owned amusement parks, water parks or theme parks.  This list is not intended to be a comprehensive list of every such event, but only those that have a significant impact on the parks or park operations, or are otherwise significantly newsworthy.

The term incidents refers to major accidents, injuries, deaths and significant crimes. While these incidents are required to be reported to regulatory authorities for investigation, attraction-related incidents usually fall into one of the following categories:
Negligence on the part of the park, either by ride operator or maintenance.
Caused by negligence on the part of the guest.  This can be a refusal to follow specific ride safety instructions, or deliberate intent to break park rules.
 The result of a guest's known, or unknown, health issues.
 Act of God or a generic accident (e.g. slipping and falling) that is not a direct result of an action on anyone's part.

Action Park

 On July 8, 1980, a 19-year-old man was riding the Alpine Slide when his car jumped the track and his head struck a rock, killing him. Action Park claimed him as an employee. However, while he had previously worked at the ski resort that would later become Action Park, he was never employed at Action Park itself. 
 On July 24, 1982, a 15-year-old boy drowned in the Tidal Wave Pool.
 On August 1, 1982, a 27-year-old man from Long Island got out of his tipped kayak on the Kayak Experience to right it. While doing so, he stepped on a grate that was either in contact with or came too close to a section of live wiring for the underwater fans, causing a severe shock and cardiac arrest. Several other members of his family nearby were also injured. He was taken to a hospital in nearby Warwick, New York where he died of the shock-induced cardiac arrest. The park at first disputed that the electric current caused his death, saying there were no burns on his body, but the coroner responded that burns generally do not occur in a water-based electrocution. The ride was drained and closed for the investigation. Accounts differed as to the extent of the exposed wiring: the park said it was "just a nick," while others said it was closer to 8 inches (20 cm). The state's Labor Department found that the fan was properly maintained and installed and cleared the park of wrongdoing; however it also said that the current had the possibility to cause bodily harm under certain circumstances. While the park said it was vindicated, it never reopened the ride, saying that people would be afraid to go on it afterward.
 In 1984, a fatal heart attack suffered by one visitor was unofficially believed to have been triggered by the shock of the cold water in the pool beneath the Tarzan Swing. The water on the ride and in that swimming area was 50–60 °F (10–16 °C), while other water areas were in the 70–80 °F (21–27 °C) range more typical of swimming pools. The Tarzan Swing and the Cannonball ride in this area were operated by spring water.
 August 27, 1984: Donald DePass, a 20-year-old from Brooklyn, drowned in the Tidal Wave Pool.
 On July 19, 1987, an 18-year-old from Queens drowned in the Tidal Wave Pool.

Adventuredome

Canyon Blaster

On July 23, 2008, a 12-year-old girl from Union City, California was found unconscious after the train returned to the loading station at the conclusion of the ride. She was airlifted to University Medical Center where she was later pronounced dead. An autopsy revealed that she died from a heart attack.

El Loco

On March 25, 2019, a woman in her mid-20s was taken to the hospital after sustaining unspecified injuries after being ejected from the ride and falling to the ground. Later reports say that the guest was a double amputee, but it was unclear which limbs this referred to.

Adventureland Park (Iowa)

Dragon

On June 8, 1991, four riders were injured when the chain lift broke. All of them were released from the hospital after treatment of their injuries; the ride was repaired.
On August 5, 2018, an employee was struck by a roller coaster car and was hospitalized with injuries to his arm. The park was fined over $37,000 by the Occupational Safety and Health Administration following the incident.

Raging River
On June 7, 2016, a 68-year-old man from Oklahoma started working at the park during the summer as a  seasonal employee. While working at the park on his sixth day on the job, he fell into the conveyor belt which moved the boats through the station where passengers would get on and off the ride, suffered a traumatic brain injury, and later fell into a coma. He was taken to Mercy Medical Center in Des Moines and died three days later from his injuries.
On July 3, 2021, a raft on Raging River carrying six passengers overturned, sending four guests to a local hospital with severe injuries. One of the passengers, an 11-year-old boy, later died. The ride had been inspected the day before the incident and was found to be in normal working order.

Sky Seats
On August 19, 1990, an 18-year-old park employee remained in serious condition at Methodist Medical Center after losing his arm when he got it stuck in the ride's mechanism while trying to retrieve his cigarette lighter.

Tornado

On July 24, 2006, three people were injured when a piece of wood leftover from ride inspections fell onto the car in which they were riding. One person was treated at the park's first aid center, another was taken to a local hospital, and the third left without being hospitalized.

The Underground

On July 30, 2019, a child's foot became lodged between the ride's vehicle and the loading platform. An operator emergency stopped the ride and the park's security staff called EMS to help get the child off the ride. The victim was taken to a local hospital where he was treated for ankle injuries. The ride was inspected and found to be operating normally.

Adventureland Park (New York)

Ladybug Coaster
On August 30, 2005, an 18-year-old employee from North Babylon, New York was struck by a roller coaster train while performing maintenance on the ride. He died from his injuries the next day at Nassau University Medical Center.

Top Scan
On August 31, 2005, a day after the Ladybug Coaster incident, a 45-year-old mentally disabled woman from Long Island was thrown from the Top Scan ride and crashed into a parked car in the parking lot after her safety harness gave way. She died from her injuries and the ride permanently ceased operations.

Haunted Mansion
On August 11, 2007, a 6-year-old boy from Bellmore, New York got his hand stuck between a moving platform and the sidewall of the attraction. He was rescued by his sister. Though he wasn't seriously injured, his family filed a $10M lawsuit against the park.
On August 29, 2008, a 5-year-old girl suffered minor injuries and was taken to a hospital for treatment after a 10-foot prop of a skeleton riding a bicycle on a tightrope fell on top of her.

Adventure Park at Grants Mill
 On May 10, 2018, the park management closed the park permanently and had the attractions dismantled, after receiving 49 code violations from city and fire inspections. Most of the violations were related to exposed wiring. The park originally opened on October 5, 2013.

Adventure World

Sky Lift
On March 30, 2014, 20 passengers were stuck on the Sky Lift due to a safety malfunction and were evacuated off the ride by firefighters. No injuries were reported.
On January 5, 2016, a woman fell  from the ride while trying to secure her son into his seat. It was reported that she was being careless and didn't follow the ride operator's instructions before getting on the ride.

Askari Amusement Park

Discovery
On July 15, 2018, a 12-year-old girl was killed and 25 other people were injured when the ride collapsed in mid-air. The park (which officially opened a month before the incident) did not reopen to the public until February 13, 2019, six months after the incident occurred.

Bay Beach Amusement Park

Zippin Pippin

On June 20, 2016, a roller coaster train carrying three people collided with an empty train in the station. The riders suffered minor injuries and were taken to a local hospital. The ride remained closed following an inspection and reopened a week later.

Beech Bend Park

Dragon Coaster
On August 16, 2015, the ride derailed after a safety malfunction. There were no injuries reported.

Jet Star
On August 30, 1975, a 17-year-old park employee was fatally struck in the head by a moving car while he and some other workers were trying to remove blocks beneath the ride prior to opening. He was taken to Bowling Green-Warren County Hospital and was pronounced dead after arrival.

Jitterbug
On July 26, 2015, 12 people suffered injuries when the ride tipped over. They were all taken to a local hospital and later released.

Bell's Amusement Park

Wildcat
On April 20, 1997, a malfunction occurred on the ride after a coaster train that was near the top of the lift hill suddenly disengaged, rolled backward, and collided with another train. A 14-year-old boy was killed while six other people suffered injuries.

Belmont Park

Giant Dipper

On December 9, 2006, a maintenance worker fell  from the roller coaster. He was tied to a safety wire at the time of the incident. He was taken to the hospital and later released. The ride remained closed for a week.

Blue Bayou and Dixie Landin'

Over The Rainbow
On June 9, 2006, a 4-year-old boy was injured after falling  from his seat on the ride. His mother wanted to sit next to him, but the seat she wanted to sit on wasn't working properly. As soon as the ride started, the boy felt some jerking movement from his seat and he fell from the ride. The boy's parents sued the park afterward.

Xtreme
On July 11, 2010, a 21-year-old woman from Lafayette, Louisiana fell  from the roller coaster. She was taken to the hospital and later died from her injuries. Investigators were unable to determine whether the ride's restraint system malfunctioned or was improperly fastened at the time of the accident. The ride was already inspected before opening but remained closed after the accident.

Branson Mountain Adventure Park

Runaway Mountain Coaster
On October 4, 2018, three people were taken to the emergency room after they suffered minor injuries when two cars collided on the tracks. The attraction was closed at the time due to a private event. It reopened the next day after being inspected.

Calaway Park

Theodore Tugboat play area
On August 4, 2014, a mother filed a report to the park after her 18-month old daughter suffered second degree burns to her feet while she was playing at the Theodore Tugboat play area. Removal of shoes was required for the attraction, and due to high temperatures that day the rubber mats, directly exposed to sunlight, became hot enough to cause injury. The child was taken to the park's first aid area and had her feet bandaged. The attraction was closed permanently and removed in December 2014.

Camden Park

Slingshot
On May 12, 2018, a park employee was injured when he was pinned under the ride. He was taken to the hospital and received stitches.

Spider
On July 23, 2011, three riders suffered minor injuries and were taken to the hospital after one of the ride's legs malfunctioned and broke apart.

Canobie Lake Park

Yankee Cannonball
On July 27, 2001, five people were injured when two trains collided.

Guest altercations
On June 16, 2014, a family from Sutton, Vermont attacked several police officers after being told that they were not allowed to bring any weapons or any other harmful devices into the park. Three people were charged with felony riot.

Rocket Man: The Human Cannonball
On August 6, 2016, a stuntman who was performing during the show fell 20 feet off a safety net. He was unharmed but was taken to an emergency room for an evaluation.

Casino Pier

Crazy Bus
On July 5, 2018, a 51-year-old woman from Philadelphia, Pennsylvania suffered minor injuries when she fell as she was taking her children off the ride. She was taken to nearby Community Medical Center. The ride was shut down for inspection.

Go-Karts
On August 25, 2018, a 21-year-old woman was sent to Jersey Shore University Medical Center after losing consciousness while riding. The go-kart she was in crashed into a wall of the track, injuring her. The ride was shut down for inspection and later reopened.

Sky Ride
On July 11, 1997, two people were injured when they fell from the Sky Ride after trying to help a 4-year-old boy when his mother got off the ride.

Jet Star
On June 19, 1994, a worker was reported to be in fair condition at Jersey Shore Medical Center after being hit by one of the cars during a test run. He was lubricating the tracks when another employee released a test car, unaware that another person was on the track.

Star Jet

On July 13, 2008, a 21-year-old park employee from Pleven, Bulgaria died from his injuries after he was struck by a roller coaster train while performing maintenance on the ride.
On October 29, 2012, strong waves and winds from Hurricane Sandy destroyed part of the pier and Star Jet was thrown into the ocean and heavily damaged beyond repair, becoming a symbol of the storm's damage.

Castles N' Coasters

Bumper Boats
On March 30, 2015, two young boys suffered burns when the bumper boat they were in caught fire.

Desert Storm

On June 26, 2016, three people were stuck on the roller coaster and had to be evacuated by firefighters when the train got stuck on the tracks. No injuries were reported.
On May 15, 2021, 22 people were evacuated from Desert Storm after the train they were on stalled halfway through the ride.

Splashdown

On November 28, 2015, a 12-year-old boy was seriously injured after falling from a water log flume ride after standing up during the ride. He required emergency brain surgery.

Castle Park

Log Ride
On May 25, 2019, three people were injured when the ride malfunctioned, throwing them into the water. One was critically injured while the others suffered minor injuries; all were taken to Riverside Community Hospital for treatment. According to park staff, the mechanical pump that was used to operate the ride had a mechanical failure. The ride remained closed following an inspection.

Chaohua Park

Travel Through Space
On February 3, 2017, a 13-year-old girl was flung from the ride and suffered fatal injuries. Footage of the incident recorded using a mobile phone later went viral on the Internet. It was later determined that her seatbelt was broken and that the safety bar did not fit tightly enough to keep her safe. Two days later after the accident, authorities announced that all rides of the same type will cease operation while an investigation is conducted.

Children's Garden
 In July 2017, three people were injured when a rope walkway collapsed.

Water Slide
 On May 4, 2019, 2 people were killed and 12 injured when they fell from the slide.

Clementon Amusement Park

Jack Rabbit
On August 5, 1998, three people were injured after the coaster's train derailed and crashed into the park's management office.

Coney Island

Hell Hole
On July 30, 1995, 13 people were injured when the passenger compartment of the ride came apart after it spun out of control. Most of the injuries occurred as people tumbled to the floor of the ride's barrel after a park operator pressed the emergency stop button. A female passenger was severely injured when her leg became tangled in the wreckage when the barrel suddenly gave way. City officials reported that the ride had passed a safety inspection in April of that year.

Himalaya
 On June 12, 1999, a 17-year-old girl was killed and 8 others were injured when a car flew off the ride.

Jumbo Jet
On May 25, 1996, the bolts on a rear wheel from the first car of the train came loose, causing it to derail and hit a nearby pole. Two people suffered injuries in the accident and were reportedly in stable condition with cuts and bruises.

Polar Express
 On August 5, 2007, a restraining lap bar broke causing an unidentified 15-year-old girl to fall out of her seat and into the center of the ride where she was briefly knocked unconscious. The ride was running in reverse at the time. The victim was taken to the hospital with head and leg injuries, and complained of neck and back pain.

Tornado
On July 11, 1955, a 43-year-old park employee was struck by a moving roller coaster train while trying to inspect the ride. The ride was temporarily shut down.

Coney Island Cyclone

 On August 23, 1988, a 26-year-old man was killed after falling from the Cyclone. The man, a maintenance worker and the only passenger at the time, was riding in the back seat of the train during his lunch break. Apparently, he eluded the safety bar and was seen standing up as the train began its descent down the first hill. He fell  and landed on a crossbeam of a lower section of track. He was killed instantly. The ride was closed following the incident, but was reopened a day later after safety inspectors concluded that the ride was safe. 
 On July 31, 2007, a 53-year-old man broke several vertebrae while riding the Cyclone. He died four days later due to complications from surgery.
 On March 30, 2015, a 52-year-old woman from Tucson, Arizona was awarded $1.5M in a lawsuit after being severely injured while riding the coaster in June 2008. The lawsuit claimed that she sprained her neck.
In March 2018, a 42-year-old man was struck in the neck by a 5-inch long metal bolt while waiting in the ride queue.

Guest accidents
On June 12, 2005, a 24-year-old man from Queens, New York drowned at the beach while playing with his friends. He was the third person to die at the park.
On July 4, 2005, a 20-year-old man from Sunset Park, New York drowned at the beach shortly after closing. The victim was airlifted to Coney Island Hospital where he was pronounced dead after arrival.
On July 22, 2014, police reported that there were multiple witnesses to a 10-year-old girl and her 9-year-old sister playing on the jetty at around 6:30 pm at the beach. The 10-year-old fell into the water and drowned. She was pulled from the water unconscious and was airlifted to a nearby hospital in critical condition, but was later pronounced dead after arrival at around 8:00 pm. There were no lifeguards on duty when the incident occurred since their shifts ended at 6:00 pm.

Conneaut Lake Park

Blue Streak
On July 24, 1949, a 40-year-old man was killed after falling  from the ride. Park officials stated that the safety restraints were not properly secured.
On October 29, 2013, two women were injured after riding the roller coaster. Reports have said that they may have hit their faces on the lap bar during their ride.

Cowabunga Bay Water Park

Surf-A-Rama Wave Pool
On May 27, 2015, a 6-year-old boy nearly drowned in the wave pool. His parents filed a lawsuit against the park saying that there were not enough lifeguards on duty while watching the guests and no children were wearing life jackets. The boy suffered a brain injury shortly after the incident.
On June 19, 2017, an 8-year-old boy was found unresponsive and pulled from the water at the park's wave pool by a lifeguard who tried to revive him by performing CPR. He died after being taken to Sunrise Hospital.

Daytona Beach Boardwalk

Sand Blaster
 On June 14, 2018, twelve guests were injured when the train derailed, with eight being taken to the hospital. Two of those guests fell  to the ground from the train that was dangling from the track. FDACS hired an engineering firm to investigate the case. They found that the primary cause was the speed, however there were also rust on the tracks and issues with the seatbelts. Several victims who hired lawyers reportedly received compensation.

Daytona Lagoon

Treasure Lagoon
On August 3, 2019, a 5-year-old was pulled out of the water after drowning in the park's wave pool. Lifeguards attempted to revive the victim while performing CPR, but later died after being taken to Halifax Health Medical Center by ambulance.

Deno's Wonder Wheel Amusement Park

Sea Serpent
On August 14, 2013, a 5-year-old boy suffered injuries to his left leg while riding the roller coaster at the park. He climbed out of his lap bar to the back of the car and fell from the tracks to the ground. He was taken to Bellevue Hospital where he was reported to be in critical condition.

Dreamworld

Rocky Hollow Log Ride

On April 16, 2016, an 18-year-old man fell from the boat he was riding when he was run over by two other boats. The man had reportedly stood up mid-way through the ride. He was left unconscious in the water where he nearly drowned. The man suffered injuries to his head, neck, rib, ankle and suffered acute respiratory failure. The ride was reopened two days later but has since been permanently closed.

Thunder River Rapids Ride

On October 25, 2016, four people — two men aged 35 and 38, and two women aged 32 and 42 — were killed when the raft they were riding hit another stopped raft, causing it to flip. Eyewitness accounts noted that the water level in the channel had dropped before the incident, but the drop did not trigger a sensor that would have stopped the ride. Investigators believe that the occupied raft was pushed up onto a stopped raft by a conveyor belt, at first mounting the stopped raft then flipping over. Of the six passengers aboard the raft, two children aged 10 and 12 were ejected from the raft but survived, while the two men were believed to be crushed under the raft and the two women were trapped underneath the conveyor belt. Dreamworld officials stated that the ride had just passed its annual inspection in September. On November 9, Ardent Leisure chief executive Deborah Thomas announced that the ride would be permanently closed and demolished. The park was closed for six weeks following the accident. Further investigation indicates that the incident occurred when one of two water pumps on the attraction failed.

Dutch Wonderland

Sky ride
On July 19, 2008, a 44-year-old woman from Ann Arbor, Michigan lost about a centimeter off the tip of her left index finger when it was caught in the safety bar.

Expoland (Japan)

Fujin Raijin II
 On May 5, 2007, a 19-year-old from Higashiomi, Shiga was killed and nineteen other guests were injured when the Fujin Raijin II derailed at Expoland in Suita, Osaka. An investigation revealed that the ride derailed due to a broken axle. None of the ride vehicle's axles had been replaced for fifteen years.  Following this accident, similar coasters at other Japanese parks were voluntarily shut down and inspected to see if they could have the same axle flaw. Expoland was cited by authorities for faulty maintenance when similar axle cracks were found on a second train a month later. On July 15, 2008, three former Expoland employees — the director and administrative manager, the head of facility and business department, and the head of the technical division — agreed with the allegation of professional negligence and violating Building Standards Law. They admitted to purposefully postponing the coaster's regular inspection, even though a visible crack was noticed months earlier, as well as submitting a false inspection report.

Extreme World

Terminal Velocity
On July 30, 2010, a 12-year-old girl from Parkland, Florida fell  from the Skycoaster at the park and landed on her back on the ground. She suffered brain damage, severe spinal and pelvic fractures, intestinal lacerations, and other severe injuries. The ride allows riders to free-fall onto a safety net, but the net was not in place when the operator released her, causing her to strike the ground. She was airlifted to the American Family Children's Hospital in Madison, Wisconsin by helicopter and stayed there for almost 2 months before being fully recovered. In October 2010, her parents filed a lawsuit to against the park over her injuries and the ride operator was charged in her fall.

Ferrari World

Flying Aces
On February 4, 2017, 24 people were stranded on the roller coaster and had to be evacuated. No injuries were reported. The park suffered extreme weather conditions at the time such as high winds reaching up to 47 km/h causing the ride to stop at the lift hill.

Funland

Cruisers
On July 24, 2017, a 49-year-old woman from Newburgh, New York was injured when she fell out of one of the cars used for the attraction after riding with her daughter. She was treated at the scene by paramedics and hospitalized.

Superflip 360
On September 12, 2021, an air compressor tank failed near the Superflip 360 ride, creating "environmental conditions" and flying debris which injured three teenagers waiting in line. A 16-year-old boy suffered serious head injuries from the incident.

Fun Spot

Orlando Location

Screamer
On June 16, 2019, firefighters rescued seven passengers after they became stuck on the ride. No injuries were reported.

Galaxyland

Mindbender

On June 14, 1986, the fourth car of the yellow train derailed before the third and final loop. The train failed to clear the loop and slid backward fishtailing wildly and crashing into a concrete pillar. Damage from the derailment caused the lap bars to disengage at some point during the ride, throwing its four passengers at least 25 feet (7.6 m) to the floor below. Three passengers died in the incident, while a fourth was critically injured. About 19 others were treated for less severe injuries at the nearby Misericordia Community Hospital. An investigation determined that bolts on the left wheel assembly had come loose causing the accident and that design flaws by Schwarzkopf, along with a lack of maintenance by the mall, were likely to blame. When Mindbender reopened in January 1987, the trains were redesigned. Existing four-car trains were converted to three-car trains (reducing seating capacity from 16 to 12), and anti-rollback features were installed. The lap bar restraint was retained, but seat belts and shoulder headrests were added.
On August 2, 1995, a park employee was injured and suffered multiple lacerations after being struck by a coaster train while trying to find a pair of glasses that had been dropped by one of the guests on the ride.

Gillians Wonderland Pier

Canyon Falls Log Flume
On July 23, 2007, five people suffered minor injuries when one of the logs apparently slid backward, colliding with another. A loose bolt was believed to be the exact cause of the incident according to a park spokesperson.

Speedway
On August 25, 2013, a 4-year-old girl from Marlton, New Jersey suffered injuries after she was ejected from the ride. She was thrown off the ride's platform after a sharp turn and became pinned underneath one of the ride's vehicles. According to the girl's uncle, the incident was caused by operator error; the operator maintaining the ride did not check that she was buckled in once the ride started moving. Park officials fired the person afterward.

Wild Wonder
The poorly maintained third party anti-rollback device caused the train to descend down the lift hill towards the station. A 39-year-old mother and her 8-year-old daughter from Pomona, New York were sitting in the front row and were ejected at a sharp turn at the bottom of the lift hill. The train crashed into another one in the station leading to guests boarding that train to be injured. The two ejected victims were pronounced dead at nearby Shore Medical Center in Somers Point, New Jersey. This accident caused the state of New Jersey to change its fine for an amusement ride law violation from $500 to $5,000.

Gilroy Gardens

Sky Trail Monorail
On July 25, 2017, nine passengers were stuck on the monorail when it broke down during the afternoon and were stranded 35 feet in the air. Firefighters rescued the passengers immediately. No injuries were reported.

Glenwood Caverns Adventure Park

Haunted Mine Drop
On September 5, 2021, a 6-year-old girl died from suffering fatal injuries after falling off the ride. Reports indicated that during boarding, the girl had sat atop an already-buckled seat belt. As the restraint appeared buckled on the ride's computer, and the rod which holds the restraint in place was properly inserted, ride operators assumed the seat belt was placed correctly and dispatched the ride, failing to visually confirm the placement of the seat belt. The girl fell  as a result. The ride and its safety systems were functioning properly, and had passed inspection prior to the incident. Following that, the park remained closed for two days while an investigation was conducted. A lawsuit was filed a month later.

Go Bananas

Guest altercations
On August 25, 2018, a brawl between two women occurred inside the amusement center during one of their child's birthday party. The fight was recorded on a cellphone and uploaded to Facebook and other online media platforms two days later, going viral and triggering a petition to shut down the venue.

Python Pit
On April 2, 2011, a 3-year-old boy from Dolton, Illinois was killed while he was riding the kiddie coaster with his twin brother at the indoor amusement center. He fell 3 or 4 feet off the ride after being ejected from his safety restraints, was struck by a moving train, and was wedged between one of the cars. The boy was pronounced dead on scene according to the Cook County Medical Examiner's office. His twin brother was not injured in the accident and was able to get off the ride safely once the train returned to the station. The facility was shut down for a brief time shortly after, but later re-opened.

Great Wolf Lodge

Minneapolis location
 On May 22, 2006, a 39-year-old man from Lakeville, Minnesota suffered a bruised spinal cord while attempting to ride the FlowRider wave ride on a boogie board. As a result, the victim had two titanium screws and a plate inserted into his neck to stabilize vertebrae and relieve pressure on his spinal cord. Doctor reports stated that the victim was almost paralyzed, but regained some movement in his limbs shortly after surgery.

Traverse City location
On August 20, 2008, a 6-year-old boy from Livonia, Michigan fell off one of the lily pads used for the Big Foot Pass attraction inside the water park, hitting his head and falling into the water. His father and one of the lifeguards tried to revive him by performing CPR, but he later died from his injuries after being taken to Munson Medical Center.

Williamsburg location
On June 17, 2007, a 5-year-old girl from Wakefield, Virginia was found unresponsive in one of the pools inside the waterpark while visiting the resort for Father's Day weekend. She was pulled from the water and taken to the Children's Hospital of The King's Daughters in Norfolk where she was pronounced dead after arrival.

Hersheypark

 In 2006, of the 1.4 million visitors to the park, 55 people were injured at Hersheypark.

Canyon River Rapids
On May 23, 1987, four people were injured when their raft overturned slightly. A park spokesperson claimed that the incident occurred due to a section of the waterway through which the rafts travel being too wide. The ride was closed for two weeks after an investigation and later re-opened with some changes being made by narrowing the section of the waterway allowing for the rafts to safely go through.

Flying Coaster
They were both taken to Good Samaritan Hospital for treatment. The incident was caused by a hydraulic gear malfunctioning.

Great Bear

On July 4, 1998, a 21-year-old college student was charged with negligence after pointing a laser toward a park employee near the coaster. The incident resulted in the worker having blurred vision when the laser was shined directly through his eyes and he complained that he couldn't see properly afterwards.

Sky Ride
On June 3, 1977, a 29-year-old painter was caught in the ride's cable system when someone accidentally started the ride. The rescue operation took more than an hour. The victim, who suffered two broken legs, was taken to Hershey Medical Center.

SooperDooperLooper

On August 25, 1977, a 16-year-old worker died from his injuries at Hershey Medical Center after being struck by one of the coaster's cars.
On May 2, 1988, a 22-year-old man suffered injuries after falling off the ride. He remained in serious condition at Hershey Medical Center.

Storm Runner

On June 26, 2018, a 9-year-old boy's safety harness allegedly could not be properly secured when he was on board one of the cars. His father (who was properly strapped in and was also riding with him) noticed that he began to feel terrified as if he felt like he was going to fall off and die from his injuries when the ride was in motion. The ride operators allegedly failed to address the concern when asked for assistance by the father. As the train exited the station, the boy got off of the ride at the last moment, leaving his father aboard as he exited the attraction. It was revealed that he and his father have suffered anxiety-like symptoms as a result of the incident. A lawsuit was filed two years later on July 2, 2020.

Tidal Force
On May 30, 1994, a 16-year-old boy injured one of his wrists being thrown  after being hit by a wave as he exited the ride. He was slammed into a metal fence receiving cuts on his forehead and wrists that required stitches. The ride was adjusted by redirecting the wave to fall on top of the patrons instead of striking them from the front.
On June 11, 1995, a man suffered injuries after a wave of water slammed him against a pillar as he was trying to exit the ride.

Timber Rattler
On May 12, 1984, two children suffered injuries after falling off the ride. Park officials stated that there were no mechanical problems and that the ride had already been inspected beforehand, but extra restraints were later installed onto each gondola.

Wild Cat
On May 30, 1929, two cars on a coaster train bumped into each other when one was stuck on top of the lift hill. It had accidentally hit a safety device which prevented the train from going down the tracks. 30 passengers had to be evacuated off the ride including three people who were treated at local hospitals for injuries sustained in the accident.

Holiday World & Splashin' Safari

The Voyage 
 On June 4, 2021, a 47-year-old female was found unresponsive when the train she was riding returned to the station. The woman was taken to a nearby hospital, where she was later pronounced dead. The ride was closed for the remainder of the day. It was determined that the woman died from internal bleeding as a result of a torn artery caused by the force of the ride, though the ride was operating normally at the time of the incident.

The Raven 
 On May 31, 2003, a 32-year-old female from New York City, died after falling out of The Raven roller coaster. The victim was visiting the park to attend "Stark Raven Mad 2003", an event hosting roller coaster enthusiasts from around the United States. At approximately 8:00 pm, the victim and her fiancé boarded The Raven in the last row of the train. Following a safety check of her lap bar and seat belt by a ride operator, the train left the station. Multiple witnesses reported that they saw her "virtually standing up" during the ride's initial and subsequent drops. During the ride's  fifth drop, she was ejected from the car and onto the tracks. When the train returned to the station, the victim's fiancé, ride operators, and a passenger who was a doctor ran back along the tracks, at which point they found her lying under the structure of the roller coaster at the fifth drop. The doctor, aided by park medical personnel, began CPR until an ambulance arrived. The victim was pronounced dead en route to the hospital.

An investigation following the accident showed that the safety restraints were working properly and that there were no mechanical deficiencies on the roller coaster. Additionally, the victim's seatbelt was found undone when the train returned to the station. A subsequent 2005 lawsuit filed by the family against Holiday World and the Philadelphia Toboggan Company, the manufacturer of the coaster train, was settled out of court in 2007. Terms of the settlement were not disclosed.

Lawnmowing accident
On May 27, 2006, a 20-year-old male park employee from Birdseye, Indiana died after being pinned under the lawnmower he was using. The man was a supervisor for the park's grounds department. The employee was working alone, mowing an area with some inclines outside the east side of the park when the incident occurred, though the park refused to speculate on exactly what might have happened. The man was found by another employee, who was then able to help lift the lawnmower off the victim with the help of other employees. Park emergency medical technicians and Spencer County EMS summoned a medical helicopter from St. Mary's Hospital and Medical Center in Evansville, Indiana, but the employee was pronounced dead before it arrived.

The Wave
On July 4, 2007, at 11:00 a.m., a 29-year-old female from Fort Wayne, Indiana died after collapsing near the edge of The Wave, falling face-down into two inches of water. Lifeguards immediately responded and pulled her out, then attempted to revive her with help from park medical personnel. Resuscitation attempts continued as the victim was transported by ambulance to Jasper Memorial Hospital, where she died. An autopsy determined the cause of death to be congestive heart failure.

Bahari River
On June 20, 2009, a filter pump on Bahari River malfunctioned, sending twenty-four guests and employees to the hospital. At 6:25 pm, the pump, which was turned off at the time, was turned back on. The pump surged, forcing a stronger than usual concentration of liquid bleach and hydrochloric acid into the water. Twenty-four people, including park staff and medical personnel, complained of troubled breathing and nausea. They were given oxygen at the park before being transported to Jasper Memorial Hospital for treatment. All were treated and released that evening. It was later determined that an interlock system, designed to prevent chemical feeders from pumping chemicals into the water when the pump was turned off, had malfunctioned.

Bomb scare
On June 30, 2016, a suspicious unattended backpack was found, causing an evacuation of the entire park.

The Firecracker
On June 8, 1997, the rear end of the coaster's car bumped into the front after the ride operator did not properly secure the manual brake. Three people that were on the rear end of the car were not injured while two people on the front suffered minor injuries and were taken to St. Joseph's Hospital in Huntingburg, Indiana as a precaution.

Hopi Hari

Hora Do Horror
On September 28, 2007, a 15-year-old boy was found unconscious and suffered an anaphylaxis attack while inside one of the Hora Do Horror tunnels. Despite being revived after a CRA by the medical team of the park, he died hours later in the hospital.

La Tour Eiffel
On February 24, 2012, a 14-year-old girl died after falling out of one of the chairs of the La Tour Eiffel. The girl fell from a height of 20 meters because she was in a seat that couldn't be utilized and was inactive for many years. Overall, eleven people, including the president of the park were indicted by the Civil Police of São Paulo by culpable homicide. The park was closed for 23 days by the Brazilian Public Ministry for investigations and had to make improvements on the safety of all rides and to reduce working hours for the employees.

Guest altercations
On September 24, 2014, a group of about 50 youngsters, who paid for their tickets, started a flash rob in the interior of the park, causing havoc and leaving six visitors hurt. Dozens of reports of people having their belongings stolen were left on the park's visiting answering service.

Houston Livestock Show and Rodeo

Power outage
On February 28, 1999, 15 people were stranded on a ride for a few minutes before they were able to get off. No serious injuries were reported, although six people complained of dizziness and neck pain.

Hi-Miler
The malfunction was caused by a single screw, which was supposed to keep the lock pin in place and the lap bar locked. The victim sustained serious chest and head injuries and later died as a result of his injuries.

ICON Park

Orlando StarFlyer

On September 14, 2020, a 21-year-old maintenance worker fell to his death while conducting a daily safety check before the park opened, falling about 50 to 60 feet onto the platform below. He was taken to Orlando Regional Medical Center where he died from his injuries.

Orlando FreeFall
On March 24, 2022, Tyre Sampson, a 14-year-old visiting Orlando from the St. Louis area, fell to his death from the ride Orlando FreeFall. According to preliminary findings from a forensic engineering team hired by the state of Florida, the safety sensor for the seat occupied by Sampson, as well as one other seat, were "manually adjusted" by operators to allow for larger riders to occupy these two seats. The adjustments allowed nearly double the normal operating range of the harness restraint. The adjusted position of the sensor allowed the safety sensor light to activate, satisfying the electronic safety mechanisms for the ride, even when the harness was unsafe for the occupant. Investigations into why and by whom the adjustments were made are still ongoing. Sampson's family is pursuing legal action and calling for the ride to be permanently shut down. In October 2022, ICON Park confirmed the demolition of Orlando FreeFall. In December 2022, the Orlando Free Fall ride owners had requested a hearing to appeal a proposed $250,000 fine from the state following its investigation into Tyre Sampson's death.

Idlewild

Rollo Coaster
 On August 12, 2016, a 3-year-old boy was injured when he fell out of the coaster train. He was airlifted to a nearby hospital in Pittsburgh. Shortly after the accident, the ride remained closed and didn't operate again for another two years before reopening again to the public in 2018 with new coaster trains and improved safety features.

Indiana Beach Boardwalk Resort

Cornball Express

On September 3, 2016, a park employee was injured as he was hit by one of the roller coaster cars while performing maintenance on the ride. He was taken to a nearby hospital for treatment and later recovered.

Hoosier Hurricane

On July 22, 2018, a tree branch fell onto the tracks of the ride and collided with a roller coaster train with passengers on board. No injuries were reported and the ride remained closed for inspection.
On June 28, 2019, a 12-year-old boy from Lafayette, Indiana suffered a medical emergency while riding on the roller coaster at the park. He was found unconscious but breathing when the train returned to its loading platform and collapsed when he got off. Paramedics performed CPR on him at the scene and he died after being taken to IU Health White Memorial Hospital. A coroner's report determined that the boy's death was caused by a pre-existing medical condition.

Istiklol Park
On June 29, 2019, the arm of a rotating pendulum ride snapped in mid-air during operation. A 19-year-old woman was killed upon impact with the ground while seven others suffered injuries.

Jazzland

Jolly Roger Amusement Park

Wildcat
On August 16, 2019, five passengers were injured when the train they were riding in apparently failed to stop and collided with another one parked at its station. They were taken to Atlantic General Hospital.

Kalahari Resorts

Sandusky Location
On August 2, 2009, a 3-year-old boy from Dearborn, Michigan drowned in the outdoor kiddie pool in the resort. His body was found floating in the pool after being separated from his mother. Lifeguards tried performing CPR on him once they arrived, but he died afterwards.
On April 11, 2017, a 25-year-old man from Chesapeake, Virginia who was on a vacation with his family fell from a three-story balcony from the resort and was killed. It was reported that he had suffered a traumatic brain injury after being hit by a truck which happened back in 2006. The man died after being taken to a nearby hospital.
On March 12, 2018, a piece of ductwork fell from the ceiling into the pool from the resort with five people, including a lifeguard, suffering minor injuries. The waterpark was closed for inspection about what might have caused the ductwork to break and later reopened.

Kankaria Theme Park

Discovery
On July 14, 2019, a cable on the ride's pendulum suddenly snapped, causing the attraction's seated end to slam into the ride's base and fall  to the ground. Two people were killed in the accident while 29 others were injured and hospitalized.

Kataplum Amusement Park

Juarez
On June 18, 2019, an online viral video showed a woman falling from her seat on one of the rides at the park. As she fell, she was hit by one of the gondolas. It is possible that she may have been injured in the accident, but it was never made public what, if any, injuries she suffered at the time. The end of the video does show the woman able to stand and walk away from the ride without assistance. Shortly after the incident occurred, Armando Cabada, the mayor of the park, posted some photos of the ride on Facebook and said that all of the rides at the park were operating properly while the one the woman was injured in was shut down for investigation.

Keansburg Amusement Park

Screamin' Demon
On August 2, 1996, seven people suffered minor injuries when one train rear-ended into the other.

Kemah Boardwalk

Aviator
On August 10, 2012, a father and his 7-year-old son along with many other passengers on the ride were stranded 30 to 40 feet high in the air when a ride operator accidentally pulled the emergency brake causing it to malfunction, leaving them up there for about 10 minutes until being brought down again. Some pieces also fell from the ride, mostly from the center column. He comforted his son and recorded the whole footage on his cell phone camera. Everyone was brought down safely and no one was injured.

Boardwalk Bullet

On December 12, 2010, passengers were forced to get off the ride due to a malfunction which led the train to suddenly stop on the tracks. Five children were injured in the accident with some receiving back and neck injuries while a young girl ended up with a bruise on her face.
On October 28, 2018, a mother from Spring, Texas filed a lawsuit to the park and claimed that her 6-year-old daughter almost fell out of the roller coaster they were riding on. She wanted more safety features to be added to all of the cars. The girl was tall enough to ride the roller coaster as the ride's height requirement is 48 inches.

Kennywood

Aero 360
On May 30, 2022, multiple riders were left suspended upside-down in midair when the ride stopped unexpectedly. Maintenance workers soon returned the ride to its loading position after several minutes. No injuries were reported, though 3 passengers visited the park's first aid office as precaution. The ride was closed for nearly one month for inspection following the incident.

Cuddle Up
On May 30, 1979, a 6-year-old boy was thrown from the cup-shaped car after putting his arms up on the ride. He later died from his injuries at Braddock General Hospital. About a year later on March 18, 1980, his mother won $20,000 in a court settlement alleging wrongful death. Though it was unclear how the accident occurred, the park added additional safety measures to the ride vehicles and increased the ride's height requirement.

Jack Rabbit

On August 18, 2016, a 13-year-old boy collapsed while waiting in line to ride the roller coaster. He was treated by paramedics once they arrived and was taken to UPMC Children's Hospital by ambulance.

Journey With Thomas 
On July 31, 2018, soon after the grand opening of the area titled ‘Thomas Town,’ the re-themed railway train derailed. No guests were hurt, but the ride closed for examination and repairs.
On August 2, 2018, the Thomas Town train derailed for the second time in a week. No injuries were reported.

King Kahuna
On July 6, 2008, twenty riders were stranded upside down for ten minutes when the King Kahuna ride malfunctioned and unexpectedly stopped for an undetermined reason.  One of the riders sued Kennywood for negligence, claiming that the ride caused spinal damage. On March 26, 2013, a jury ruled that the plaintiff had a pre-existing spinal condition, and that any injury she suffered was not due to the ride.

Merry-Go-Round
On August 8, 2020, a woman had to be taken to the hospital after having a medical emergency at the attraction.

Pirate
On August 1, 2018, several passengers were stuck on the ride when it malfunctioned after its brakes failed, causing it to keep swinging with them on board. The operator maintaining the ride couldn't make it stop and had to wait for about 10 minutes in order for it to respond. No injuries were reported, but some guests that were riding when they got off were complaining of being nauseated and other situations.

Popover
On August 7, 1968, a 15-year-old girl from Monongahela, Pennsylvania died and a 15-year-old-girl from Monessen, Pennsylvania fractured both wrists after falling  from the ride when a bolt supporting one of the cages broke, causing the cage to collapse, dropping the girls to the ground.

Raging Rapids 
On July 25, 1989, two rafts collided, throwing some passengers off the ride. Human error was reported as the cause of the incident according to a park spokesperson. The ride temporarily ceased operation that same day and reopened the next day after safety inspections were made.
On May 12, 1991, six teenagers were hurt when a raft overturned. The accident occurred in 2.5 feet of water and all but one of the riders was treated and released from McKeesport Hospital. The sixth was admitted due to a strained arm and wrist along with swallowing some water.
In 2012, a 51-year-old woman suffered two broken ribs and a punctured lung after riding.
On July 2, 2017, a man's eye became infected by a microsporidia parasite. He underwent surgery to remove the parasite, but the operation was only partially successful. A lawsuit was filed claiming the water used on the ride was "dirty, stagnant, and sludge-like".

Steel Phantom
On May 12, 1991, the ride was temporarily shut down for maintenance after several riders complained of suffering neck pain. Park officials determined it was running too fast. Trim brakes were added to slow it down and the coaster reopened on May 23, 1991.

Swing Around 

 On July 12, 2002, the ride ran its cycle for nearly 30 minutes with passengers trapped onboard after a malfunction caused by a power surge prevented the ride from being stopped. The cycle began around 10:10pm and ended around 10:38pm. Prior to the incident, the ride operators ran a test cycle in which the ride functioned normally. Deeming the ride to be in proper working order, the operators allowed passengers to board the attraction. The ride was eventually safely brought to stop with assistance from a Kennywood supervisor.  According to a park source, a similar malfunction occurred a few years prior to the incident. No injuries were reported, but a few riders became nauseated due to motion sickness.

Thunderbolt
On May 17, 1968, a 15-year-old boy from Greensburg, Pennsylvania, fell to his death after standing up on the ride.
On July 9, 1999, there was an accident on the Thunderbolt when operators failed to brake an incoming train, which collided with the train being loaded. 35 people were injured in the crash. After the accident, the headlights on the cars were partially removed because the electrical system did not hold up well against the vibration of the cars.

The Whip
On May 31, 2002, a 29-year-old female guest from Monroeville, Pennsylvania was killed when the roof of The Whip collapsed during a microburst. On July 20, 2007, a trial jury awarded the victim's family US$1.945 million.

Kishkinta

Disco Dancer
On May 12, 2016, the ride suddenly malfunctioned killing one 25-year-old employee and injuring nine others, all of which were also park staff. The accident occurred during a test run before re-opening for the first time since heavy rain flooded the Chennai area five months earlier.

Knoebels

Crystal Swimming Pool 
On July 6, 2011, a young boy was found face down in the pool. By the time the ambulance arrived, lifeguards performed CPR and were successful at getting a heartbeat and the boy breathing on his own. He died later at Geisinger Medical Center from trouble breathing. It was later determined that the child suffered from a pre-existing heart condition that is associated with Noonan syndrome.
On July 16, 2016, another young boy died after he was found unresponsive in the swimming pool. He was rushed to a nearby hospital where he was pronounced dead. The incident may have been caused by a pre-existing medical condition.
On August 15, 2016, an 11-year-old girl from Hellertown, Pennsylvania was injured and remained in critical condition when a 40-foot tree toppled on her family's campsite. At around 4:30 pm when a storm occurred during the time when they were camping at one of the campgrounds, the tree fell due to the strong gust of winds. The girl, her father, and her two siblings were all taken to a nearby hospital for treatment.

Impulse

 On March 26, 2015, a worker was injured and suffered cuts on the back of his head and hand as he was hit by a roller coaster car. The ride was being tested at the time before it officially opened to the public a month later. He was taken to a nearby hospital and later recovered.

Scenic Skyway
 On June 13, 2003, a man was seriously injured in a  fall from the Scenic Skyway chairlift ride at Knoebels Amusement Park. The man was a member of a group home for mentally disabled people and was riding alone. He was airlifted to a local hospital and recovered. The ride had opened two weeks before the accident. Inspectors found no problems with the ride.

Speed Slide
 On March 2, 1999, an attorney representing two girls who sustained injuries while riding the park's Speed Slide discovered a history of complaints of injuries made by riders after they had ridden the same ride. The tort lawsuit filed sought $9,200 in medical costs and at least $50,000 in damages on behalf of one girl, age 11. The suit also sought $5,300 in medical costs and at least $100,000 in damages on behalf of the other girl, age 12. The park was charged with negligence, failure to monitor the amount of force of the water and its effect on riders, failure to fix defects, and failure to provide adequate warnings to riders.

Krug Park

Big Dipper
On July 24, 1930, sometime after 6:00 p.m., the park's Big Dipper roller coaster crashed when a bolt worked itself loose. Four cars containing children and teenagers plunged to the ground. Four people were killed and 17 injured.

La Feria de Chapultepec Mágico

Quimera
On September 28, 2019, the last train derailed after breaking loose from its track and plunging  to the ground carrying 10 passengers on board. The accident occurred after two men hit their heads on a steel support and fell from the ride. They died after sustaining severe head injuries. Two women were taken to a nearby hospital in serious condition and six people were treated at the scene. The park closed permanently after the incident following an investigation to be conducted. After the investigation, city officials stated that none of the rides at the park had been properly maintained when the accident occurred.

Lagoon Amusement Park

Roller Coaster

In 1945, a 20-year-old man from Ogden, Utah fell to his death as he attempted to stand up when the train was on its highest hill. He hit a number of support trestles on the way down.
In 1946, a man was struck by the train as he was working on scaffolding on the ride. He suffered skull, leg, and arm fractures, as well as internal injuries, and died at a Salt Lake hospital on September 1, 1946.
On June 12, 1989, a 13-year-old girl stood up and fell  to her death. She was pronounced dead at the scene.
On September 4, 2021, a lawsuit was filed in which a paraplegic man's foot became shredded while on the ride. He was safe inside the coaster's train, but his paralyzed leg was not secured properly when it eventually got caught on the wooden supports. He was visiting the park a year prior in October 2020 during the time where the incident took place.

Puff The Little Fire Dragon
On April 30, 1989, a 6-year-old boy attempted to exit the vehicle near the end of the ride. He was run over and killed by an oncoming train.

Sky Ride

On August 14, 2021, a 32–year–old riding the transport ride climbed over his vehicle's railing and attempted to do pull ups from 50 feet in the air. He subsequently fell, and later died from his injuries on August 16, 2021.

Lake Compounce

The Tornado
 On August 20, 1999, a 16-year-old park employee was knocked over and then crushed by the Tornado ride. The employee died from his injuries 10 hours later.

Lake Plunge
 On July 1, 2000, a 6-year-old boy fell into the lake when the tube he had used on the Lake Plunge water slide overturned. The boy was found unconscious after a twenty-minute search and died six days later as a result of the injuries. In response, Lake Compounce made stricter safety precautions and made life jackets a requirement for children.

Boulder Dash

 On June 13, 2001, a train from the Boulder Dash rollercoaster ride was sent on a  preliminary run when it struck and killed a 23-year-old groundskeeper who had been cutting weeds by the side of the ride.

Miniature Golf Course
 On May 16, 2004, a 5-year-old boy was killed when he was struck by a fallen tree branch from a decaying 80-foot red oak tree that hung above the park's miniature golf course.

Zoomerang

On July 31, 1997, a month after the ride opened during the same year, 27 people were stranded on the ride for  hours after its emergency system stopped the train the passengers were on as it was on the tracks. All were evacuated and no injuries were reported. 
On June 14, 2001, one of the trains stopped on the ride's cobra roll with 28 people on board after it somehow managed to continue running on the track while its automatic braking system malfunctioned. Like the previous incident, there were no injuries and everyone was evacuated off safely with firefighters at the scene. Park officials later determined that the incident was caused by a safety sensor malfunction as the ride was shut down for inspection. This incident occurred a day after an employee was killed after being struck by a train from the Boulder Dash roller coaster.

Gillette Railway
On August 4, 1986, several riders were injured after two train engines collided at a switching station. Four people were taken to Bristol Hospital for treatment while one was treated at the park's first aid center. Investigators determined that the accident was caused by operator error. The ride resumed operation later that evening with only one train engine running as the other needed repairs.

Lake Winnepesaukah

Boat Chute
 On May 27, 2018, a woman broke her foot on the water ride. The park was fined $500 for not reporting this incident in a timely manner.

Bumper Cars
 On June 17, 2018, a 16-year-old suffered a minor injury while riding. The park reported this incident properly, but the news report for this item pointed out that the park was cited three times in three years for failing to report incidents.

Fly-O-Plane
On July 16, 2016, two 9-year-old boys suffered injuries after being ejected from their seats from the ride and fell off while it was still in motion. After the incident occurred, the ride remained closed following a safety inspection and reopened to the public about a month later.

Wild Lightnin'
 On May 27, 2018, a 62-year-old woman injured her arm and head while riding. The park was fined $1000 for not reporting this incident in a timely manner.
 On June 10, 2018, a woman fell out of the ride vehicle when her legs slipped out from the lap bar. The guest had to have surgery to address a broken shoulder and upper arm. Inspectors did not find any fault with the ride. The park received a warning for the 15-hour delay in reporting this incident.

Guest altercations
 On April 19, 2003, a crowd disturbance described as a "near-riot" involving 500 to 700 youths took place outside the park in Rossville, Georgia after management decided to close the park 90 minutes early. Catoosa County Sheriff Phil Summers claimed the incident was caused by parents leaving their children unattended at the park with little or no money, thus unable to participate in the park's activities. When sporadic fighting began in the crowd, the decision was made to close the park early, which escalated the fighting. Law enforcement agencies from Georgia and Tennessee were dispatched to the scene when the crowd began to disrupt traffic on roads surrounding the park. After the incident, the park instituted a new policy of requiring visitors under 21 years of age to be accompanied by a parent or guardian. Visitors are also required to purchase some sort of admission.

Lakemont Park

Little Leaper Coaster
 On September 2, 1991, a seventeen-year-old ride operator for the Little Leaper Coaster named Chris Whitfield got dragged away by the roller coaster and lost his right leg after it got mangled between the train and its track/chain. The accident was featured on the television series Rescue 911 on September 29, 1992, on CBS.

Land of Illusion Adventure Park

Haunted Scream Park
On October 21, 2011, a 16-year-old girl visited the park with her mother to watch her father perform in a band. Because of a pre-existing medical condition she suffered a heart attack and collapsed inside the haunted house attraction. Her mother and the paramedics both tried to revive her by performing CPR, but she later died at Atrium Medical Center.

Longshan Amusement Park

Scream
 On May 1, 2015, two guests were killed and three were injured when they were thrown off the attraction. This was the opening day of the amusement park, and witnesses stated that they believed the ride was started by ride operators before the guests were secured.

Luna Park Sydney

Ghost Train

Melbourne Royal Show

Rebel Coaster
On September 25, 2022, a woman in her 20s was reported to be in critical condition at Royal Melbourne Hospital after suffering severe head injuries as she was struck by a coaster train while trying to retrieve her phone. A Victoria police spokesperson claimed that officers were trying to determine the exact cause of the incident; however, the ride will be temporarily closed while an investigation was conducted.

Memphis Incredible Pizza Company

Incredible Spin Coaster
On November 11, 2016, a 17-year-old girl from Lafayette, Tennessee who was on a church youth group class trip with other students lost consciousness shortly after riding the spinning roller coaster at the indoor amusement center. She began to feel ill while at the place but still got on the ride with her friends. When it was over, she collapsed after exiting and the staff did everything they could to revive her such as performing CPR, but she later died after being taken to St. Francis Bartlett Hospital. Her parents stated that she died from a pulmonary embolism.

Mt. Olympus Water & Theme Park

Medusa's Indoor Water Park
On January 23, 2015, a 4-year-old boy nearly drowned in the indoor water park. EMS responded and he was airlifted to a nearby hospital and later recovered.

Opa
On March 6, 2014, a 63-year-old man from Fremont, Wisconsin fell 17 feet from the Opa wild mouse roller coaster after a lap bar malfunctioned. He was taken to a nearby hospital where he was treated for numerous fractures, a severe brain injury and was in a coma for three weeks. The ride was closed permanently and later removed.

Neptune's Water Kingdom
On December 21, 2016, a 16-year-old boy from Port St. Lucie, Florida died after falling 35 feet from the Dragon's Tail waterslide. The park was already closed for the season at the time and his death was ruled accidental according to the police.

Resort Hotels
On August 7, 2018, a 3-year-old girl from Bensenville, Illinois was fatally struck and seriously injured by a moving car in the parking lot at the Hotel Rome resort of the park. She was airlifted to nearby UW Hospital but later died from her injuries.

Zeus' Playground
On July 8, 2015, a cable snapped on the Catapult ride before two riders were launched in the air. They were not injured. The video was uploaded on Facebook and other media platforms before being removed. The ride was closed for inspection following the incident but was removed from the park two days later.

Morey's Piers

Fly – The Great Nor'easter
On August 23, 1995, a 36-year-old male worker was killed after he was struck in the head by a passenger's foot while picking up trash in a fenced area beneath the ride. The park later put a new restricted section from the ride shortly after the incident.

Giant Wheel
On June 3, 2011, an 11-year-old girl who was on a school field trip from Pleasantville, New Jersey was riding on the Giant Wheel alone until she fell from the ride. She was taken to Cape Regional Medical Center in nearby Cape May Court House but was later pronounced dead after arrival. The police reported it may have been a freak accident. The ride was shut down briefly following the incident and her parents sued the ride's manufacturer shortly after her death.

Jet Star
On July 20, 1997, a 9-year-old boy was injured after falling  when the ride's emergency brake system was activated. The victim was taken to Cooper Hospital – University Medical Center in Camden, New Jersey and also reported to be in stable condition.

Sea Dragon
On August 19, 2011, five people were injured while riding when the center mast that was used for the Sea Dragon ride suddenly broke apart while it was in motion. One of the park guests was taken to the hospital with non-life-threatening injuries, while the four others suffered minor injuries and were treated at the scene.

Sea Serpent

On June 28, 1998, 13 of the 23 riders on board the ride were injured while riding the roller coaster. The chief executive officer of the park reported that a wheel coming off a rear axle from the coaster train was what might have been the cause of the incident.

SpringShot
In July 2021, a 13-year-old girl from Weatherly, Pennsylvania was struck in the face by a seagull during the ride, but was not injured.

Zoom Phloom

On July 2, 2010, a child suffered serious injuries and was taken to the hospital after he struck his head in the log he was riding in. He was the only person riding at the time and no one else was with him. After that, the park management made a new rule saying that guests should always be with their child while riding the attraction and that it was forbidden to ride alone.

Myrtle Beach Pavilion

Ferris Wheel
On July 20, 1991, one of the carriages from the Ferris wheel tipped over after some people accidentally rocked on it, plummeting them almost  to the ground. A 17-year-old boy from Wilmington, North Carolina died of head injuries after being taken to Grand Strand General Hospital and two girls were also injured.

Hyrdro Surge
In 1994, a 3-year-old girl nearly drowned and eight other passengers on board suffered injuries when a raft on the Hydro Surge overturned. According to media reports, the incident occurred once the raft was lined up at the conveyor belt.

Nagashima Spa Land

Steel Dragon 2000

On August 23, 2003, a wheel from the train came loose and fell off during the ride injuring two people. The ride remained closed for almost three years before reopening again.

New York-New York Hotel and Casino

Big Apple Coaster

 On December 23, 2020, the middle car of one of the new trains derailed on the lift hill during a test run, causing severe damage to part of the catwalk.

Niagara Amusement Park

Ferris Wheel
On August 11, 1991, a 14-year-old boy from Deerfield, Kansas slid under the safety bar used on the ride, fell  and suffered severe injuries to his head after his seat slipped off its axle. He was taken to Kenmore Mercy Hospital where he later died. The boy was visiting some of his relatives at the time in Silver Springs, New York, 50 miles southeast of Buffalo.

Nickelodeon Universe (Mall of America)

SpongeBob SquarePants: Rock Bottom Plunge
Between 2011 and 2012, eight people complained of injuries from the ride. Six people complained of neck injuries and two complained of back injuries.

Tak Attack
In April 1998, a  plastic nut came loose on The Mighty Axe (later renamed Tak Attack), causing the ride to come to a stop with riders stuck upside down at the very top. The loose nut had interrupted the power to the seating platform. The five riders were stuck for about an hour before park mechanics were able to get them down.

Log Chute

On Saturday, August 1, 1998, a 12-year-old boy, David Craig of Cable, Wisconsin, fell off the log chute. When the boat neared the top of the chute, the boy began to panic and reached outside of the log to grab a railing. The ride operator attempted to stop the ride, but the log had already begun its descent down the major drop. Losing his grip, he fell off the chute, falling onto the landscaping rocks. The boy died from his injuries. O.D. Hopkins Associates, Inc., the manufacturer of the ride, inspected it and found it was in proper working order. It remains the only fatal accident to occur at any Camp Snoopy location.
On November 4, 2007, a conveyor belt on the log chute malfunctioned, causing one log to crash into the other. However, there were only minor injuries. The ride was inspected and repaired and then reopened on November 15, 2007.

Screaming Yellow Eagle

On Saturday, August 15, 1998, an 8-year-old girl died of a heart attack a week before her 9th birthday, after she rode the Screaming Yellow Eagle (later known as Danny Phantom Ghost Zone), a rotating platform ride from Chance Rides. Her parents said she died from a heart attack because she had a history of heart problems for five years before her death. The ride was operating properly.

Backyardigans Swing-Along
On May 14, 2008, four people were slightly hurt, suffering minor leg injuries when the Backyardigans Swing Along malfunctioned, apparently spinning faster than normal. The ride was shut down when it became apparent that it was malfunctioning and remained closed until maintenance crews found and fixed the problem.

Ocean Breeze Waterpark

Trident
On February 19, 2019, a woman from James City County, Virginia filed a $1 million lawsuit to the park after reporting a concussion that she suffered serious injuries in 2016 when the inner tube she was using "collapsed on itself," causing her head to hit a wall. She was knocked unconscious and suffered a concussion and subsequent seizures.

Ocean Park Hong Kong

Buried Alive
On September 16, 2017, a 21-year-old man was hit in the head by a coffin bottom after he accidentally entered an employees-only area of the haunted house attraction. He was taken to Ruttonjee Hospital and died from his injuries. It was later questioned why the restricted area was not securely locked and/or marked with any warnings at the time of the incident. The attraction remained closed following an investigation.

Mine Train
On November 20, 2014, a 63-year-old man from the Philippines died after riding the Mine Train roller coaster while visiting the park with his family. An autopsy revealed that he died from suffering a heart attack and had a history of health problems for the past 20 years.

Ocean Express
On December 5, 2010, seven passengers on board the ride were injured when a driver operating the train accidentally activated the emergency braking system while they were all going towards the summit. One of the passengers who was a 70-year-old man was taken to Queen Mary Hospital in Pok Fu Lam with facial injuries and was also in critical condition and his wife suffered injuries to her face and knees. The other passengers were taken to Ruttonjee Hospital in Wan Chai, all suffering minor injuries. The train later reopened with a switch protector being installed over the emergency brake button.

The Summit
On April 9, 2014, a 50-year-old Chinese man who was a tourist from Hubei, China lost his balance while he was sitting on a railing and fell  to his death below the ground. He was found unconscious when paramedics arrived and died after he was taken to Ruttonjee Hospital in Wan Chai. The police ruled it an accident.

Ohio State Fair

Fire Ball
On July 26, 2017, during the fair's opening day for the 2017 year, the ride malfunctioned and broke apart mid-swing, causing the passengers to be flung off the ride. An 18-year-old man was killed after falling 50 feet (15 m) while seven others were injured. Two people also reported being in critical condition. The ride was already inspected before it opened for operation. KMG, the ride's manufacturer, along with Chance Morgan, shut it down while they pended an investigation. All the other amusement rides at the fair were closed the next day following the fatal incident according to the Ohio Department of Agriculture and Ohio State Highway Patrol. The other rides at different amusement parks that were made by the same manufacturer also ceased operations in response to the incident.

Old Indiana Fun Park

 On August 11, 1996, a 4-year-old girl was paralyzed from the chest down, and her 57-year-old grandmother was killed after the miniature train ride at the Old Indiana Fun Park derailed and overturned as it approached a curve. The two victims were crushed under the weight of the cars.

Old Town

Slingshot
 On March 26, 2021, a cable on the ride snapped leaving two passengers stranded in mid-air. Crews from the Kissimmee and Osceola County fire rescues were able to evacuate the riders a few hours later. No injuries were reported.

Overseas Chinese Town East

Space Journey
 On June 29, 2010, six people were killed and nine were injured when a Space Shuttle-simulator ride called Space Journey fell to the ground in Shenzhen, China. According to eyewitnesses, all 11 cabins turned upside down, ejecting passengers. Another eyewitness claimed that a power shortage caused the accident.

Playland (New York)

Dragon Coaster
 In 1988, an 8-year-old girl choked to death while chewing gum on the ride.

Mind Scrambler
 On May 22, 2004, a 7-year-old girl from New Rochelle, New York was killed when she fell out of the ride after maneuvering out of her restraints.
 On June 29, 2007, a 21-year-old female park employee from White Plains, New York was killed when the ride was started by a second employee while the victim was still assisting guests with their safety restraints.  Park officials stated that a safety precaution (put in place after the 2004 Mind Scrambler incident) was not followed.  A report issued by the State's Labor Department on August 24, 2007, stated that the ride operators were running the ride improperly. The ride owner was cited for providing inadequate training. Due to this incident, the Mind Scrambler was closed permanently and later dismantled.

SuperFlight
On August 18, 2007, three people were stranded on the ride for nearly an hour. Park maintenance inspected and found it happened due to a sensor detecting the ride's cars were too close to one another which caused it to be stopped automatically. The incident came after a park employee died after being struck by a ride vehicle on the Mind Scrambler two months prior.

The Whip
 On August 18, 1938, a 19-year-old was killed when he was hurled from the ride.

Wild Mouse
 On July 8, 1984, six people were taken to the hospital after suffering injuries when one of the trains they were riding in collided with another. The ride was shut down for investigation and later reopened. Park officials stated that a mechanical failure was the cause of the accident.

Ye Old Mill
 On August 3, 2005, a 7-year-old boy from Norwalk, Connecticut died of blunt force trauma to the head after he climbed out of a boat on the Ye Old Mill ride, where he became trapped underwater by a conveyor belt.  The victim's family sued the county that owned Playland, and on March 24, 2009, the defendants were ordered to pay US$1.25 million, as well as create a scholarship in the victim's name. The scholarship is awarded annually to the Playland employee who exhibits excellence in safety and customer service.

Guest Accidents
An autopsy showed the victim had a blood-alcohol level well over the legal limit.

Playland (Vancouver)

The Beast
On August 12, 2019, park officials temporarily shut down the ride after a malfunction occurred, leaving passengers covered in oil as they were riding and some that were waiting in line. It reopened two weeks later.

Wooden Roller Coaster

On August 18, 1992, a 13-year-old girl's safety bar became loose while riding and fell off from a lower section of the coaster's wooden supports. She did, however, survive the fall, but was taken to Burnaby Hospital for treatment where she had a sore ankle and a cut on her arm. It was officially the first incident to be related to this ride after it opened to the public 34 years prior without any major injuries or deaths being reported based on it.

Playland's Castaway Cove

GaleForce
On April 13, 2019, two test dummies that were riding the roller coaster were thrown off by one of its trains and crashed into a roof of a nearby hotel. It was reported that the water-filled dummies had leaked and shrunk, allowing them to be ejected; there were no reported injuries. When the train returned to its station, the park management checked all of the safety features inside the trains to make sure that everything was secure and in place.

Quassy Amusement Park

Twister
On August 11, 1994, a 6-year-old boy from Ansonia, Connecticut was killed when he was trapped underneath the cart after he was trying to get off the ride.

Guest Accidents
On July 14, 2004, a 19-year-old man from Brooklyn, New York drowned while he was swimming with other campers at the lake. Lifeguards performed CPR on him and was taken to a nearby hospital where he was pronounced dead on arrival.

Queens Land

Free Fall
On June 24, 2019, 12 people were injured when a cable on the ride snapped as the ride was coming to a stop. Local authorities shut down the entire theme park until the park was able to show legal documents proving each ride was in a safe working order.

Raging Waters

Wave Pool
On June 1, 2018, a 12-year-old girl nearly drowned while playing in the wave pool at the park. She was pulled from the water at around 11:00 am and a lifeguard performed CPR on her until she was airlifted to a nearby hospital.

Rainbow's End

On February 10, 1990, a 19-year-old man died from injuries received after falling off the bungee cord when the ride operator accidentally forgot to secure him in. The person who maintained the attraction was later found guilty of manslaughter and then sentenced to 200 hours of community service.

Corkscrew
On November 17, 2018, 15 passengers were evacuated from the Corkscrew roller coaster after the ride stopped on top of its lift hill due to a safety malfunction. No injuries were reported but 4 people angrily demanded refunds when they got off.

Enchanted Forest Log Flume
On November 10, 2012, a woman's leg got stuck on the log flume ride as she was trapped between one of the logs and a wooden fence. Parts of the fence were removed by firefighters to free her trapped leg, and she was eventually freed. The woman was taken to a nearby hospital suffering minor injuries.

Ferris Wheel
On February 2, 2008, a 21-year-old worker was killed as he was working on the Ferris Wheel at the park while performing maintenance. He got trapped on one of the carriages and was freed by firefighters, but was later pronounced dead at the scene.

Rockin' Raceway

The Hawk
On March 14, 2004, a 50-year-old woman fell  to her death from a pendulum-like ride, "The Hawk." Charles Stanley Martin, the park manager, was charged with second-degree murder and was subsequently convicted of reckless homicide.

Royal Adelaide Show

Airmaxx 360
On September 12, 2014, an 8-year-old girl from Malaysia died after being thrown from her seat on the ride. The owners maintaining the ride were fined over $157,000 following the incident.

Sahara Las Vegas

Speed – The Ride

On April 5, 2007, a circuit was blown up, causing a train with sixteen passengers to valley before the vertical loop.

Santa Cruz Beach Boardwalk

Cyclone
On August 4, 2008, a woman bruised her leg and a 9-year-old boy suffered minor injuries when one of the doors fell off the ride after a malfunction during the time of its normal operational hours. One of the passengers was treated at the scene by paramedics.

Santa's Village AZoosment Park

Candy Cane Sleigh Ride
On June 10, 1993, a sleigh full of passengers overturned as it was going around in a curve, spilling some of them out. A 67-year-old woman suffered a traumatic head injury and later died after being taken to Sherman Hospital. Other people who were on board suffered minor injuries sustained in the accident and were all treated by paramedics.

Santa's Village (New Hampshire)

Poogee Penguins Spin Out Coaster 

 On August 27, 2022, a 51 year-old employee fell 8 feet (2.4 m) off of a ride platform after being struck by a ride vehicle and suffered serious injuries.

Scandia Family Fun Center

Sky Screamer
The crane that they were on collapsed and fell into one of the park's miniature golf course's holes and part of the batting cages. One of them was injured and got one of his arms stuck between two pieces of metal while the other suffered minor injuries and bruises. They were eventually rescued by firefighters.
 On May 5, 2018, a 20-year-old man and a 14-year-old boy were stranded for 45 minutes when the attraction became stuck with the riders  in the air when the attraction lost power. Firefighters were brought in to rescue the guests. The riders were not hospitalized.

Schlitterbahn

Schlitterbahn South Padre
On March 6, 2013, a 20-year-old seasonal employee at Schlitterbahn South Padre was fatally injured when an overhead gate slammed down and pinned him. He was left on life support for organ donation and later died from the injuries on March 11, 2013. OSHA investigated and fined Schlitterbahn for six safety violations related to the fatal incident.

Schlitterbahn Kansas City
On August 7, 2016, a 10-year-old boy was killed in the park while riding Verrückt, the tallest water slide in the world at the time of the incident. The raft he was riding in went airborne at the top of the second hill, causing it and its riders to collide with metal hoops and netting covering the slide. The boy was decapitated and died instantly.  Two other unrelated riders in the same raft sustained injuries. The ride was decommissioned and scheduled for dismantling. Although the park settled civil claims with all parties in 2016, a Wyandotte County grand jury filed criminal indictments against the park and three current or former executives in 2018. The indictment accused the park and its employees of negligence, as well as concealing design flaws and other issues with the ride. On February 22, 2019, all charges were dropped by Judge Robert Burns against the construction company and Schlitterbahn owners. As a result of this incident Schlitterbahn Kansas City was closed at the end of the 2018 season, and later demolished.

Seabreeze Amusement Park

Quantum Loop
On June 21, 1997, nine people suffered minor injuries when the ride stopped suddenly after descending down its incline.

Siam Park (Thailand)

Flume ride
On October 23, 2007, one woman was killed and five others injured when the ride vehicle fell  to the ground from the top of the lift hill.  Park management said that there was a drop in electric power, causing a water pump to fail to control sufficient water levels on the ride.

Super Spiral
On January 12, 2008, 28 children, ages 10 to 13, were injured when they spiraled down two meters to the ground after the final sections of the Super Spiral water slide collapsed.

Silverwood Theme Park

Corkscrew

On November 29, 2013, a man lost his balance while trying to get into the coaster train and fell  from the tracks. It took over an hour for him to be rescued, (the man was attended to by park EMT staff.  it was an hour before he was transported) and was found unconscious. He was taken to a nearby hospital and the ride was shut down for several hours following an investigation.

Star City

Park-wide incidents
On October 2, 2019, a major fire occurred around midnight which destroyed 80% of the park. There were no injuries or deaths reported. Some of the rides and attractions are still standing, but not operating.

Giant Star Wheel
On July 10, 2018, a man died from his injuries after falling from the top of the Ferris wheel.

Jungle Splash
On September 9, 2006, a 13-year-old female patron died after falling off the ride. On September 19, the engineer's office temporarily suspended operations of the amusement park coinciding with the same day that the management had reached a settlement with the family of the deceased patron and another non-fatal incident at the park's bumper car ride.

Star Flyer

Witnesses say that his body hit a metal structure before plummeting to the ground.
On February 7, 2018, 10 passengers were stranded on the ride when it suffered an electrical malfunction.

Storybook Land

Big Truck Ride
 On May 8, 2011, the ride derailed as it came up on the first turn, causing cars to go off the track and fall  to the ground, injuring two adults and a 1-year-old boy. The cause was determined to be an internal component. Management decided to remove the ride, explaining, "We simply can't be sure about the precise cause of the failure and will not risk the safety of our patrons when we cannot be 100% certain that the ride can be made completely safe." It was replaced with an attraction called Workzone, which opened in the summer of 2014.

Out on a Limb
On October 18, 2019, a girl was injured after she fell from the ride. Park officials temporarily shut down the ride pending an investigation. It was the second incident that occurred at a New Jersey theme park in October 2019 after a 10-year-old girl died after falling from a Super-Sizzler style carnival ride a few days prior at a county fair in Deerfield Township on October 12, which had resulted in New Jersey suspending all Sizzler rides in the state while they investigated.

Stratosphere Tower

High Roller

On December 26, 1996, one of the cars from a roller coaster train partially derailed, causing it to abruptly stop on the tracks after two wheels fell off during the ride. Passengers were safely evacuated off the train and no injuries were reported. The ride was repaired and put back into service  hours later.

Splash Adventure

 In 1999, when the park was called Visionland, five people were injured when a raft overturned.
 In 2001, when the park was called Visionland, a boat filled with park employees overturned when the employees rocked the boat. The establishment was shaken up but no one was injured.
 On August 4, 2009, when the park was called Alabama Adventure, a family of three and one other park visitor were injured when the ride's boat capsized. Witnesses said that the family's boat hit an empty boat and overturned. The family was underwater for approximately 20 seconds.
 On June 6, 2011, when the park was called Alabama Adventure, a fight broke out between several youths and spread throughout the park. One guest described it as a borderline riot. The Bessemer Police were called to the park and no more guests were allowed into the park. The incident was blamed on a "$10 before 10 a.m." promotional event that was mishandled by park staff.
 On June 3, 2018, a 10-year-old boy was injured when he hit his head while floating around Warrior River.

Trimper's Rides

Hampton I
On June 28, 2012, a 2-year-old boy from Accomack County, Virginia was critically injured and suffered a traumatic brain injury after one of the cars struck him while he tried to get off the ride. He thought the ride was over until realizing that it was stopped to let another child off. When he tried to get back on, he was struck by the vehicle, fracturing his skull. On July 29, 2014, his mother filed a $1 million lawsuit to the park two years after the accident. She claimed that the operator maintaining the ride was careless not knowing that her son was still out of the car before checking that everything was all clear.

Tidal Wave
On July 23, 2010, 3 people were injured while riding the roller coaster when a cable snapped on the ride, resulting in a mechanical failure. They were all taken to the hospital. The park claimed that one of the passengers was hit by debris while waiting in line and two were shaking around when the ride stopped.

Urban Air Trampoline and Adventure Park

Lakeland, Florida location
The incident caused multiple broken bones, a collapsed lung, and a brain injury. He was airlifted to Tampa General Hospital. A report concluded that operators had not fully secured the boy's harness prior to dispatch. On November 6, 2019, a lawsuit was filed by the boy's mother.

Water Works Park
On August 5, 2007, an unidentified 10-year-old girl suffered severe internal injuries while riding the speed slide at the Denton, Texas park. The accident report filed by the on-duty lifeguards stated that the injuries were caused by the victim's failure to follow park rules, namely keeping her legs crossed at the ankles, while riding.  The park rule regarding crossing ankles on a water slide is common in the industry, and is one method (along with wearing a wet suit) used to prevent "straddle injuries."

Water World, Colorado

Captain Jack's Wave Pool
On July 21, 2009, a 48-year-old man was found unresponsive and drowned in the wave pool as a lifeguard pulled him out of the water. Once paramedics arrived, they tried to revive him by performing CPR, but he later died as a result of drowning according to preliminary reports. It was the park's first fatality in 30 years of operation.

The Wave

Emerald Plunge
 On May 27, 2017, a 10-year-old boy hydroplaned off the water slide during the park's grand opening weekend, suffering injuries to his back. The victim's family settled with the slide's manufacturer for US$2.5 million. According to the father, the slide had been tested for height, not weight.

Wonderla Park

Bangalore location

The Hurricane
On June 18, 2019, a viral video that was posted online on social media showed four people suffered minor injuries when the car they were riding in suddenly malfunctioned as the ride began midway. The police said that they were unaware of the accident at the time when it occurred.

Wonderland Park

Drop of Fear
On May 9, 2015, a woman riding with four other people was injured when she was hit in the head by a large chunk of metal. She felt dizzy after riding and went to a local hospital and was later released. It was reported that she suffered a concussion and also had a bruised knee.

Mouse Trap
On April 27, 2016, a 6-year-old boy's seat belt came undone during the ride. His father was recording a video at the time to show the boy's mother when he noticed his son fell to the bottom of the car they were sitting in. The father then held onto him the entire rest of the ride until the train came back into the station. No injuries were sustained, and the car was removed from the ride for inspection to make sure all of its safety features were properly secure and in place.
On May 21, 2019, 12 guests needed to be rescued from the ride after the train became stuck at the top of the coaster.

Zyklon
On April 19, 1987, a 15-year-old boy died after falling out of the ride when his restraining bar suddenly gave way.

World Waterpark

Corkscrew
On August 5, 2018, a 59-year-old woman from Saskatoon, Canada who was at the park for her granddaughter's 5th birthday was sliding down the Corkscrew water slide when her ring got stuck on a piece of foam. The slide was shut down for inspection while a lifeguard helped find the missing ring and her finger which was torn off. Her finger was amputated while the park investigated the incident.

Guest Accidents
On October 3, 2018, six people who were attending an electronic music festival called Soundwave inside the waterpark suffered minor injuries. One of the websites named Showpass reported it as "the wildest indoor beach party." Four of the six people suffered life-threatening conditions while the remaining two were taken to the hospital in stable condition.
On January 27, 2019, three people who were attending the same event inside the place also suffered injuries and were taken to the hospital in serious condition.

Worlds of Wonder

Feedback
On June 27, 2017, according to a Facebook post, a park guest reported that a man was injured when he fell off the ride after his safety harness came undone. He hit his head on one of the supports and suffered minor injuries.

Yuhuan Park
On September 24, 2018, a 5-year-old boy's neck became trapped by one of the carriages from the Ferris wheel and almost slipped from his seat. He was eventually rescued and suffered minor injuries.

Yulong Shuiyun Water Amusement Park
On July 31, 2019, a malfunction occurred at the park's wave pool, sending out tsunami-sized waves and injuring 44 guests at the scene. Five of them were also hospitalized with fractured ribs. The cause of the incident was blamed by a power cut that damaged the equipment used to make the water go in and out. The park temporarily closed down the attraction for repairs. The incident was later uploaded onto social media where it went viral.

Zehnder's Splash Village

Super Loop Speed Slide
On February 18, 2018, a 10-year-old girl from Grand Blanc, Michigan died of cardiac arrest after she was found unconscious while riding one of the slides at the resort. According to the paramedics, while trying to revive her, they discovered that she had a rare medical disorder called long QT syndrome, her heart was beating fast and she had a pulse. Her parents said that she may have been too excited at first when they realized that she was finally tall enough to ride. They then sued the resort afterward for not providing any proper medical care sooner at the time of the incident.

References

Independent
Death-related lists
Health-related lists